Events from the year 1775 in Canada.

Incumbents
Monarch: George III

Governors
Governor of the Province of Quebec: Guy Carleton
Governor of Nova Scotia: Lord William Campbell
Commodore-Governor of Newfoundland: John Byron
Governor of St. John's Island: Walter Patterson

Events
 April 19 – The American War of Independence begins, at Concord and Lexington, Massachusetts.
 May 1 – A bust of George III is found, in Montreal, adorned with beads, cross, and mitre, with the words "Pope of Canada: Sot of England." A reward of 500 guineas does not lead to apprehension of the culprit.
 May 10 – Ethan Allen takes Fort Ticonderoga.
 June 9 – Martial law is proclaimed in Canada.
 August 21 – Generals Schuyler and Richard Montgomery, with 1,000 American Patriots come to Canada, and invite the inhabitants to rebel.
 September 17 – Montgomery besieges Fort St. Johns.
 September 25 – Attempting to take Montreal, Ethan Allen and many of his 150 followers are captured, at Longue Pointe, and are sent to England.
 October 18 – American Patriots capture Chambly.
 October 25 – On Benedict Arnold's expedition to Quebec from New England, his force begins crossing the height of land between Maine and Canada for the descent to the St. Lawrence River.
 November 3 – Hindered by Colonel Warner, of Vermont, Governor Guy Carleton cannot relieve St. Johns, which surrenders to Montgomery.
 November 12 – General Montgomery tells Montrealers that, being defenceless, they cannot stipulate terms; but promises to respect personal rights. He demands the keys of public stores, and appoints 9a.m. tomorrow for the army's entrance, by the Recollet gate. (see "Nov 12, 1775 Articles of Capitulation")
 November 13 – The invaders appropriate royal stores.
 December 31 – At the Battle of Quebec, British forces repulsed an attack by the Continental Army to capture Quebec City and enlist French Canadian support.
 Having captured Montreal, American Patriot troops fail to take Quebec City or elicit local support, and withdraw within a year.

Births
April 13 or 16 – Charles James Stewart, clergyman of the Church of England, bishop, and politician (d.1837)
April 25 – William Warren Baldwin, doctor, militia officer, jp, lawyer, office holder, judge, businessman, and politician (d.1844)
May 24 – Matthew Whitworth-Aylmer, 5th Baron Aylmer, army officer and colonial administrator (d.1850)
September 13 – Laura Secord, heroine of the War of 1812 (d.1868)
November 28 – Jean-Charles Létourneau, politician (d.1838)

Deaths
 January 3: Robert Campbell, merchant and political figure in Nova Scotia. (b.1718)
 November 3: Juan José Pérez Hernández, naval officer and explorer (b. ca. 1725)

Historical documents

American Revolutionary War
"We are involved in all the Horrors of a Civil War" - Bostonian on April 19 "general Engagement" between troops and militia, fearing many more deaths

Quebec Act mandated authority of governor means "he is possessed of absolute and despotic Powers" limited only by his need of Council majority vote

Gov. Guy Carleton offers $200 reward for person who disfigured King George bust in Montreal and attached "False and Scandalous Libel" about him

Continental Congress resolves to end exports to Quebec, Nova Scotia, Island of St. John's, and Newfoundland, as well as to British fisheries

Finding "the protestant and catholic colonies to be strongly linked together," Congress calls on "oppressed Inhabitants of Canada" to join it

Carleton says Ticonderoga and Crown Point taken by Benedict Arnold, who also got Navy sloop, bateaux and military stores at Saint-Jean-sur-Richelieu

"We have been puzzled to discover what we ought to do with the Canadians and Indians" - John Adams sees need for Canadians (Note: "savages" used)

Gen. Israel Putnam gets support bid "from one of the Indian Nations near Canada," while Carleton is said to find "the People in general" won't fight rebels

Carleton laments "impotent Situation" of only 600 soldiers and no militia, and Quebeckers' minds poisoned by "Hypocrisy and Lies" from other colonies

Alexander Hamilton: "King, through[...]his creatures, the Governor and Council may[...]mould the criminal laws of Canada[...]to the most tyrannical views"

Congress orders Gen. Philip Schuyler to take St.-Jean-sur-Richelieu and Montreal if "practicable [and not] disagreeable to the Canadians"

"We are this day informed in Congress that the six Nations and Canada Indians are firmly disposed to observe a strict neutrality"

Congress has "received certain intelligence that General Carleton[...]is instigating the people of [Canada] and the Indians to fall upon us"

Chiefs with families (numbering 1,600) in Montreal to declare "they are unanimous" in leading their people against "the Bostonians" (Note: "savage" used)

Call for men for Royal Highland Emigrants regiment "to engage during the present Troubles in America only," for grants of 200 acres rentfree for 20 years

"Neutrality and your present blessings are incompatible with each other" - Canadians must expect worst if Colonies' "arm'd and numerous rabble" invade

Lake Champlain skirmish north of Quebec boundary leaves rebel captain dead and later decapitated by Indigenous men with British soldiers

Report that Canadians "highly approved" Congress's letter, and are uneasy about possible scarcity of grain products because provisions go to Boston

Gen. Schuyler summarizes intelligence about British, his eagerness to invade, and Gen. Richard Montgomery's departure plans (Note: "savages" used)

From Cambridge, Washington sends "(though late in the Season)" detachment of 1,000 men under Arnold to Quebec City by way of Kennebec River

Account of battle near St.-Jean-sur-Richelieu in which small British force of mostly Indigenous men drives off several hundred rebel invaders

British regulars and Indigenous men ambush part of force under Schuyler near St.-Jean but are routed, while Ethan Allen's force cuts link to Montreal

Accounts of Battle of Longue-Pointe near Montreal in which Ethan Allen and some Chambly Canadians (who had prospect of plunder) were captured

Thomas Jefferson notes "intrepidity" of Canadians helping besiege St.-Jean but sees they can get discouraged; mentions "bitter enemy" Luc de la Corne

Gen. Richard Montgomery reports Chambly capitulation after mostly Canadian siege (Note: "St. John's" is Saint-Jean-sur-Richelieu)

Gen. Montgomery reports artillery assault of St.-Jean, followed by surrender when garrison learns relief from Montreal is defeated

"Pitiful and humorous spectacle" - Col. Arnold's bedraggled regiment arrives at St. Lawrence River near Quebec City from Maine

Congressional agents ordered "to exert your utmost endeavours to induce the Canadians to accede to a union with these colonies" and send delegates

Schuyler relates Carleton's escape from Montreal before its fall to Montgomery and looks ahead in hope of Quebec City's capture

Arnold reports he has too few men to storm Quebec City, and they lack sufficient clothing and ammunition, so he has retired to await Montgomery's force

Arnold reports that Montgomery has joined him and they are at Quebec City, "which has a wretched motley Garrison[...], the Walls in a ruinous Situation"

Death of Gen. Montgomery at Quebec reported by rebel general in Montreal, who begs for reinforcements to sway impressionable Canadians to his side

Canada
Physician "commodiously lodged for treating all Kinds of Diseases" if people send him their case in writing, and poor helped gratis if postage paid

Upper Town, Quebec City "Doctor of Physic" offers advice gratis and medicines at reasonable rates, innoculates for smallpox and treats venereal disease

Mary Barnsley denies husband's accusations and says "bad Usage and ill Treatment from him were the Cause of my Elopment [sic]"

Select Society for "literary Intercourse" resists "present rapid Torrent of Gaming, and devote[...]their Leisure to so rational and useful an Amusement"

In "Mathematical Thesis," natural philosophy students Panet, Perrault and Chavaux will "resolve such Problems in Algebra and Geometry" as put to them

For sale at Anne Taylor's distillery: "Essense of Spruce" for making 30 gallons of beer, as well as spruce beer "for Family or Ship's Use"

John Robinson, gelder, "cuts Horses with the Greatest Security, splays Heifers, and gelds and splays Pigs [with] utmost Care and constant Attendance"

Nova Scotia

Following raid on Saint John River by "Rebels from Machias," Gov. Legge proclaims Nova Scotia militia subject to "Service in Time of War" act

Ships from Nova Scotia carrying provisions to Boston risk capture, including by "Spider Catchers," 8-10-ton boats based in New England seaports

Two Nova Scotia House members deny being "factious and rebelliously disposed," but one reported to Gen. Gage, who has list of "disaffected" in N.S.

Governor's proclamation warns Nova Scotians "not in any Manner directly or indirectly [to] aid or assist with any Supplies whatever, any Rebel or Rebels"

Noting "a most unnatural and dangerous Rebellion" in America, treason in Canada, and home "Invasion," Nova Scotia to collect rate of 5s to £5 for militia

Refugees to take loyalty oath and enter province as inhabitants, but those refusing oath may be jailed, and "traiterous Correspondence" will be punished

Refugees to be provided food and granted land free of rent for 10 years, and Nova Scotians encouraged to supply lumber and coal to Caribbean market

Nova Scotia farmer and former Army officer imprisoned by Massachusetts General Court after he visits Boston with no good reason for going there

Scores of patients, age 50 down to under 1, inoculated for smallpox, are "save over the Disease; without having had one bad, or unpromising Symptom"

Detailed "advice and instructions concerning innoculation, by self-applying "pocky matter" in scratches, addressed to the industrious poor of Halifax"

Provincial treasury audit has found books and papers "of high Concern" missing; £100 reward offered for their return, and £500 for whoever took them

"To be Sold, A likely well made Negro Boy, about Sixteen Years old,---Enquire of the Printer."

Any Nova Scotia resident may bring livestock and vegetables into Halifax for sale in street or building, even during Market hours

"Paltry artifice" - Reader criticizes Nova Scotia Gazette publisher for reprinting "trash" contrived in Philadelphia papers by Continental Congress

"She opened her mouth with wisdom, and in her tongue was the law of kindness" - Mrs. Jane Chipman of Cornwallis, who died after falling from horse

Charles Wright disavows wife Hannah's debts after she keeps "bad Company," sells some of furniture ("to my great Distress and Damage") and runs off

Prince Edward Island

Leaving for Britain, St. John's Island governor Walter Patterson says he will "try to rouse the proprietors [to] promote" their own interest

"I never saw better grass, white clover, wheat, barley, rye, oats, peas, potatoes, and all kinds of garden stuff[...]altho' they are very bad farmers"

Charlottetown raided by privateers in November and governor, surveyor general and many public and private papers carried off

Newfoundland

Three 20-gun ships and several sloops to be added to naval force "to prevent the Americans carrying on any Fishery on the Banks of Newfoundland"

Navy frigate on Newfoundland station "destroyed a number of stages which the French had erected beyong the Limits allowed them for[...]the Fishery

Labrador

"Very unpleasant situation" - Trapped at edge of snowy Labrador precipice, George Cartwright and friend drop down using length of cod line in his pocket

Indigenous nations

New "Indian Affairs" rules include sending superintendent annually to check on local officials, who will act as JPs and admit Indigenous evidence in court

Local "Indian King" Solomon says he is given "Liberty" to join rebels by Kanien’kéhà:ka, who will "hold 500 men in readiness to join us on the first Notice"

Using metaphor of son (colonies) injured by "proud and wicked servants" (ministers) of father (King), Congress tells Haudenosaunee to stay out of war

With presents and talks, Continental Congress has created northern department of Indian affairs covering Six Nations "and all to the Northward of them"

In Albany, 700 Kanien’kéhà:ka and Onondaga declare friendship and hope to bring over Canadian relations, despite "all Governor Carleton's endeavours"

Members of St. Francois tribe offer services to Americans, and say Indigenous people and French  generally are "determined not to act against us"

Superintendent of Indian Affairs Guy Johnson in Montreal and expected to sail for England, "the Season being too far advanced for [Indian] Operations"

Haudenosaunee sachems refuse Johnson's war feast and song at Montreal; Kanien’kéhà:ka are rebuked for not sending for their people in Canada

Alexander Henry describes people in Cree village on Lake Winnipeg, where women not only "beguile" his men, but are lent for year's service to them

References

 
75